The Billboard Hot 100 is a chart that ranks the best-performing singles of the United States. Published by Billboard magazine, the data are compiled by Nielsen SoundScan based collectively on each single's weekly physical and digital sales, and airplay. In 2006, 18 singles reached the top of the chart, the most number-ones in a chart year since 1991. A 19th single, Mariah Carey's "Don't Forget About Us", started its run at number one in 2005.

In 2006, 20 acts achieved their first U.S. number-one single, either as a lead artist or featured guest, including D4L, Paul Wall, Ali & Gipp, Slim Thug, James Blunt, Ne-Yo, Daniel Powter, Rihanna, Chamillionaire, Shakira, Wyclef Jean,  Taylor Hicks, Nelly Furtado, Timbaland, Fergie, T.I., and Akon. Krayzie Bone and Justin Timberlake, despite having hit number one with Bone Thugs-n-Harmony and NSYNC respectively, earns their first number one songs as solo acts. Justin Timberlake and Beyoncé each had two number-one singles in this year. During the year, eight collaboration singles topped the chart, breaking the record set in 2003 and 2004, both of which had seven.

Beyoncé's "Irreplaceable" is the longest-running single of 2006, beginning its run atop the chart for 10 consecutive weeks in late December to late February 2007. "Irreplaceable" became the 20th single to score at least 10 weeks at number one since the era of longer-running singles began in 1992. Other singles with extended chart runs include Timberlake's "SexyBack", which stayed at number one for seven straight weeks, and Nelly Furtado's "Promiscuous" for six weeks. Knowles' "Check on It" and pop singer Daniel Powter's "Bad Day" both topped the chart for five weeks.

Powter's "Bad Day" is the best-performing single this year, topping the Billboard Top Hot 100 Hits of 2006. "Hips Don't Lie" gave Shakira a number-one single credit, her first since she began her recording career in 1996. The feat made her the first Colombian recording artist to have topped the Billboard Hot 100. In 2006, Powter and Furtado were the only Canadian recording acts to have reached the summit of the chart.

Chart history

Number-one artists

See also
2006 in music
List of Billboard number-one singles
Top Hot 100 Hits of 2006

Notes
[a]  Longer-running singles refer to number-one singles that spent at least 10, either consecutive or non-consecutive, weeks atop the Billboard Hot 100.

References

Additional sources
Fred Bronson's Billboard Book of Number 1 Hits, 5th Edition
Joel Whitburn's Top Pop Singles 1955-2008, 12 Edition
Joel Whitburn Presents the Billboard Hot 100 Charts: The 2000s
Additional information obtained can be verified within Billboard's online archive services and print editions of the magazine.

United States Hot 100
2006